Sparrel Tyler Turner (September 19, 1846 – February 24, 1927) was an American politician who served as a member of the Virginia House of Delegates and Virginia Senate.

References

External links
 
 

1846 births
1927 deaths
Republican Party Virginia state senators
19th-century American politicians
20th-century American politicians